The Sauber C33 is a Formula One racing car designed by Sauber to compete in the 2014 Formula One season. It was driven by Esteban Gutiérrez and Adrian Sutil, who joined the team after Nico Hülkenberg returned to Force India. The C33 was designed to use Ferrari's new 1.6-litre V6 turbocharged engine, the 059/3.

The chassis was designed by Eric Gandelin, Ben Waterhouse and Willem Toet with the car being powered with a customer Ferrari powertrain. 

The car was plagued by weight issues early in the season, to the point that, to compensate for this, a tall Sutil (who, relatively speaking, was one of the heaviest drivers in the field) did not eat for two days in a desperate attempt to remain competitive.

Ultimately, the C33 had the unfortunate distinction of being the least competitive Sauber ever built, as Sauber failed to score points for the first time in their history in 2014. In addition, due to the financial status of the team, both drivers were dropped at the end of the season to make way for a new line up of Marcus Ericsson and Felipe Nasr.

Complete Formula One results
(key)

† — Driver failed to finish the race, but was classified as they had completed greater than 90% of the race distance.

References

C33
2014 Formula One season cars